Torsken is a former municipality that was located on the western coast of the large island of Senja in the old Troms county, Norway. The municipality existed from 1902 until its dissolution in 2020 when it was merged into the new Senja Municipality. The administrative centre of the municipality was the village of Gryllefjord.  Other larger villages in Torsken municipality included the villages of Torsken, Medby, and Flakstadvåg.

The historic Torsken Church in the village of Torsken dates back to the 18th century. Ånderdalen National Park was partially located inside the old borders of Torsken and neighboring Tranøy municipalities.

At the time of its dissolution as a municipality on 1 January 2020, the  municipality was the 310th largest by area out of the 422 municipalities in Norway. Torsken was also the 401st most populous municipality in Norway with a population of 943.

General information
The municipality of Torsken was established on 1 January 1902 when it was separated from the municipality of Berg. The initial population of Torsken was 1,229.  During the 1960s, there were many municipal mergers across Norway due to the work of the Schei Committee. On 1 January 1964, the Rødsand area of Torsken (population: 160) was transferred to the neighboring Tranøy Municipality.

In March 2017, the Parliament of Norway voted to merge the municipalities of Berg, Torsken, Lenvik, and Tranøy.  The new municipality will encompass the whole island of Senja plus part of the mainland.  The new municipality will be established on 1 January 2020 as Senja Municipality.

Name
The municipality (originally the parish) is named after the old Torsken farm (Old Norse: Þoskar), since the first Torsken Church was built there. The farm is named after Torsken mountain, and that name is probably derived from Norse þo(r)skr which means "cod". (Several mountains in Norway are named after their likeness with a fish.)

Coat of arms
The coat of arms was granted on 23 March 1990. The official blazon is "Sable, a cross moline Or". This means the arms have a black field (background) and the charge is a cross moline. The cross moline has a tincture of Or which means it is commonly colored yellow, but if it is made out of metal, then gold is used. The cross is a symbol for both Christianity and the importance of the local harbor. The economy of Torsken is largely dependent on its harbors and an anchor cross is an appropriate symbol. The arms were designed by Ivar Enoksen.

Churches
The Church of Norway had one parish  within the municipality of Torsken. It was part of the Senja prosti (deanery) in the Diocese of Nord-Hålogaland.

Economy

Most of the inhabitants live in the fishing village of Gryllefjord in the northern part of the municipality. The second most important village is Torsken, only a few kilometers to the south. Kaldfarnes/Medby, Grunnfarnes, and Flakstadvåg are other fishing villages further south. Most people work in the fields of fishing or fish processing.

The municipality has few productive forests, but there are some spruce trees planted in sheltered areas. In the southern parts of Torsken there is some usable farmland.

Transportation

The Andenes–Gryllefjord Ferry that goes across the Andfjorden to Andenes on the island of Andøya is operated during about two months each summer.  The road from the northern part of the municipality to Kaldfarnes, Grunnfarnes, and Flakstadvåg is far from direct.  One must drive north and then east to Berg and then south to Tranøy before turning northwest and returning to Torsken.  These are the only road connections from the rest of Norway to Torsken.

Government
Torsken municipality (while it existed) was responsible for primary education (through 10th grade), outpatient health services, senior citizen services, unemployment and other social services, zoning, economic development, and municipal roads. The municipality was governed by a municipal council of elected representatives, which in turn elected a mayor.  The municipality fell under the Senja District Court and the Hålogaland Court of Appeal.

Municipal council
The municipal council  of Torsken was made up of 15 representatives that were elected to four year terms.  The party breakdown of the final municipal council was as follows:

Geography
Torsken is a rugged area on the west coast of the island of Senja. Many different fjords cut into its mountainous coastline including Sifjorden, Selfjorden, Torskefjorden, Gryllefjorden, and Skipsfjorden. Many of the valleys contain marshes or lakes. The bedrock under Torsken consists mostly of gneiss and granite.

Climate

See also
List of former municipalities of Norway

References

External links
Municipal fact sheet from Statistics Norway 

 
Senja
Former municipalities of Norway
1902 establishments in Norway
2020 disestablishments in Norway
Populated places disestablished in 2020